Spirit of the Season was recorded during the Mormon Tabernacle Choir's 2006 Christmas concert "The Spirit of the Season," with special guest Sissel, joined by the Mormon Tabernacle orchestra and bells, conducted by Music Director Craig Jessop.  The album was released in 2007 along with a concert DVD and reached No. 1 on the Billboard Classical chart within five weeks of its release and remained there for nine weeks.  The album was also nominated for two Grammy Awards, Best Classical Crossover Album and Best Engineered Album - Classical.  The recorded concert was also broadcast on PBS stations in December 2007 to more than 4 million Americans.

The album was the choir's first No. 1 Billboard Classical album. and topped the Billboard Traditional Classical Albums chart for nine consecutive weeks.  The album was also released in Sissel's home of Norway via Universal Norway on December 10, 2007 due to high demand where it charted in the top 10.

Track listing

Charts

References

Tabernacle Choir albums
2007 Christmas albums
Christmas albums by American artists
Christmas albums by Norwegian artists
Sissel Kyrkjebø albums